On 15 June 1944, United States Marine forces landed on the southwest coast of the island of Saipan in the central Marianas chain; these were followed a day later by US Army forces. This invasion was part of Operation Forager, an effort to recapture the entire Marianas chain from the Empire of Japan. 

The island had been a Japanese possession since it was captured by the Imperial Japanese Army during World War I. As military conflict with the United States became increasingly likely during the 1930s, Japan expended great effort in fortifying Saipan. In mid-1944, nearly 30,000 troops were based on the island, almost double the estimates of US intelligence.

US forces declared Saipan secure on 9 July 1944.

United States

Naval forces 
United States Pacific Fleet
Admiral Chester W. Nimitz HQ at Pearl Harbor

 United States Fifth Fleet
 Admiral Raymond A. Spruance in heavy cruiser Indianapolis

 Joint Expeditionary Force (Task Force 51)
 Vice Admiral Richmond Kelly Turner in amphibious command ship Rocky Mount

 Northern Attack Force (Task Force 52 – Saipan and Tinian)
 Vice Admiral Turner

 Southern Attack Force (Task Force 53 – Guam)
 Vice Admiral Richard L. Conolly in amphibious command ship Appalachian

Ground forces 

Expeditionary Troops (Task Force 56)
Lieutenant General Holland M. "Howlin' Mad" Smith
 Chief of Staff: Brig. Gen. Graves B. Erskine
 Personnel Officer (G-1): Lt. Col. Albert F. Metze
 Intelligence Officer (G-2): Col. St. Julien R. Marshall
 Operations Officer (G-3): Col. John C. McQueen
 Logistics Officer (G-4): Col. Raymond E. Knapp
 Plans Officer (G-5): Col. Joseph T. Smith
 Northern Troops and Landing Force (Task Group 56.1 – Tinian and Saipan)
 Consisting of V Amphibious Corps
 Southern Troops and Landing Force (Task Group 56.2 – Guam)
 Consisting of III Amphibious Corps

 V Amphibious Corps
Lieutenant General Holland M. Smith
 Chief of Staff: Brig. Gen. Graves B. Erskine
 XXIV Corps Artillery (Brig. Gen. Arthur M. Harper)
 1st Provisional Gun Group
 225th Field Artillery Howitzer Group

Left beaches 

  2nd Marine Division  (21,746 officers and enlisted)
 Major General Thomas E. Watson
 Asst. Div. Cmdr.: Brig. Gen. Merritt A. Edson
 Red beaches
  6th Marine Regiment 
 Commanding Officer: Col. James P. Riseley
 Executive Officer: Lt. Col. Kenneth F. McLeod
 1st Battalion (Lt. Col. William K. Jones)
 2nd Battalion (Lt. Col. Raymond L. Murray)
 3rd Battalion (Lt. Col. John W. Easley)
 Green beaches
  8th Marine Regiment
 Commanding Officer: Col. Clarence R. Wallace
 Executive Officer: Lt. Col. Jack P. Juhan
 1st Battalion (Lt. Col. Lawrence C. Hays Jr.)
 2nd Battalion (Lt. Col. Henry P. Crowe)
 3rd Battalion (Lt. Col. John C. Miller Jr.)
 Floating reserve
  2nd Marine Regiment 
 Commanding Officer: Col. Walter J. Stuart
 Executive Officer: Lt. Col. John H. Griebel
 1st Battalion (Lt. Col. Wood B. Kyle)
 2nd Battalion (Lt. Col. Richard C. Nutting)
 3rd Battalion (Lt. Col. Arnold F. Johnston)
 Landed after D-Day
  10th Marine Regiment (Artillery) 
 Commanding Officer: Col. Raphael Griffin
 Executive Officer: Lt. Col. Ralph E. Forsyth
 1st Battalion (Lt. Col. Presley M. Rixey)
 2nd Battalion (Lt. Col. George R. E. Shell)
 3rd Battalion (Maj. William L. Crouch)
 4th Battalion (Lt. Col. Kenneth A. Jorgensen)
  18th Marine Regiment (Engineer) 
 Commanding Officer: Lt. Col. Ewart S. Laue
 1st Battalion, 18th Marines (Lt. Col. August L. Vogt)
 2nd Battalion, 18th Marines (Lt. Col. Chester J. Salazar)
 Attached units
 1st Battalion, 29th Marine Regiment (Lt. Col. Guy E. Tannyhill; Lt. Col. Rathvon M. Tompkins; Lt. Col. Jack P. Juhan)
 715th Amphibian Tractor Battalion (Army)

Right beaches 

  4th Marine Division (21,618 officers and enlisted)
 Major General Harry Schmidt
 Asst. Div. Cmdr.: Brig. Gen. Samuel C. Cumming
 Blue beaches
  23rd Marine Regiment
 Colonel Louis R. Jones
 Exec. Ofc.: Lt. Col. John R. Lanigan
 1st Battalion (Lt. Col. Ralph Haas)
 2nd Battalion (Lt. Col. Edward J. Dillon)
 3rd Battalion (Maj. John J. Cosgrove)
 Yellow beaches
  25th Marine Regiment
 Colonel Merton J. Batchelder
 Exec. Ofc.: Lt. Col. Clarence J. O'Donnell
 1st Battalion (Lt. Col. Hollis U. Mustain)
 2nd Battalion (Lt. Col. Lewis C. Hudson)
 3rd Battalion (Lt. Col. Justice M. Chambers)
 Floating reserve
  24th Marine Regiment
 Colonel Franklin A. Hart
 Exec. Ofc.: Lt. Col. Austin R. Brunelli
 1st Battalion (Lt. Col. Robert N. Fricke)
 2nd Battalion (Lt. Col. Richard Rothwell)
 3rd Battalion  (Lt. Col. Otto Lessing)
 Landed after D-Day
  14th Marine Regiment (Artillery)
 Colonel Louis G. DeHaven
 Exec. Ofc.: Lt. Col. Randall M. Victory
 1st Battalion (Lt. Col. Harry J. Zimmer)
 2nd Battalion (Lt. Col. George B. Wilson Jr.)
 3rd Battalion (Maj. Robert E. MacFarlane)
 4th Battalion (Lt. Col. Carl A. Youngdale)
  20th Marine Regiment (Engineer)
 Lt. Colonel Nelson K. Brown
 Exec. Ofc.: Capt. William M. Anderson
 1st Battalion (Maj. Richard G. Ruby)
 2nd Battalion (Maj. John H. Partridge)
 Attached units
 708th Amphibian Tank Battalion (Army)
 773rd Amphibian Tractor Battalion (Army)
 534th Amphibian Tractor Battalion (Army)

Landed D+1 
 
  27th Infantry Division (Army) (16,404 officers and enlisted)
 Major General Ralph C. Smith (thru 24 Jun) 
 Major General Sanderford Jarman (24 Jun thru 28 Jun)
 Major General George W. Griner (after 28 Jun)
 Blue beaches
 Infantry
 105th Infantry Regiment
 106th Infantry Regiment
 165th Infantry Regiment
 Artillery
 104th Field Artillery Battalion
 105th Field Artillery Battalion
 106th Field Artillery Battalion
 249th Field Artillery Battalion
 Armor
 762nd Tank Battalion
 766th Tank Battalion
 Engineer
 102nd Engineer Combat Battalion
 502nd Engineer Combat Battalion
 Navy
 UDT 5
 UDT 6

Japan

Central Pacific Area Fleet HQ
Vice Admiral Chūichi Nagumo (self-inflicted gunshot 6 July)
Chief of staff: Rear Adm. Hideo Yano (seppuku 7 July)
 Thirty-first Army
 Lieutenant General Hideyoshi Obata (on inspection tour of Guam during battle; seppuku there 11 August)
 14th Air Fleet
 Defenses of Saipan
 Lieutenant General Yoshitsugu Saito (seppuku 7 July)
 Approx. 25,500 army and 6,200 navy personnel
 43rd Division
 118th Infantry Regiment
 135th Infantry Regiment
 136th Infantry Regiment
 Divisional support
 47th Independent Mixed Brigade
 316th Independent Infantry Battalion
 317th Independent Infantry Battalion
 318th Independent Infantry Battalion
 Other units
 3rd Independent Mountain Artillery Regiment
 9th Tank Regiment (of 1st Tank Division)
 3rd Battalion, 9th Independent Mixed Regiment
 1st Battalion, 18th Infantry Regiment
 25th Antiaircraft Artillery Regiment
 7th Independent Engineer Battalion
 14th Independent Mortar Battalion
 17th Independent Mortar Battalion
 Miscellaneous straggler units

See also 
Orders of battle involving United States Marine forces in the Pacific Theatre of World War II:

 Battle of Guadalcanal order of battle
 Battle of Tarawa order of battle
 Guam (1944) order of battle
 Battle of Leyte opposing forces
 Battle of Peleliu opposing forces
 Battle of Iwo Jima order of battle
 Okinawa ground order of battle

Notes

References

Bibliography

External links
 Appendix A - Tactical Units of Northern Troops and Landing Force on Saipan
 Appendix C - Japanese Order of Battle on Saipan

World War II orders of battle
World War II operations and battles of the Pacific theatre
United States Marine Corps in World War II
Battles and operations of World War II involving Japan
Saipan